Saud Abdulaziz Al Gosaibi (1963 - ) (Arabic :سعود عبد العزيز القصيبي) was managing director of Ahmad Hamad Al Gosaibi & Brothers Company (AHAB), a family-owned diversified holding business group based in Alkhobar, Saudi Arabia. AHAB has wide-ranging investments in finance, banking, insurance, manufacturing, trading, real estate, shipping, hoteliering and travel services. Al Gosaibi graduated from St. Edward's University with a Bachelor of Business Administration and was the only son of Abdulaziz Hamad Al Gosaibi, a regionally iconic investor, businessman and philanthropist, who, with his two brothers, founded the Ahmad Hamad Al Gosaibi & Brothers Group.  On his father's death in 2002, he, along with his six sisters, inherited their father's one-third equity in AHAB. Al Gosaibi was also chairman of Nama Chemicals, a publicly traded Saudi company and the vice chairman of the Ash Sharqiyah Chamber of Commerce & Industry.  Additionally Al Gosaibi was the founder of Saudi Re, KSA's first Re-Insurance company, as well Tamkeen Real Estate Development Co. Saud Algosaibi is also a poet and a writer and has numerus initiatives in Heritage and art. In 2022 he founded Eastern Province Archology & Heritage society at which he was appointed as chairman.

See also 
 Al Gosaibi family
 List of billionaires

References

External links 
 A.H. Al Gosaibi & Bros  website
 Nama Chemicals website
  Chamber website
 Forbes.com: Forbes World's Richest People

Saudi Arabian businesspeople
Saudi Arabian billionaires
1963 births
Living people